The Collection is a compilation album by Christian music singer Amy Grant, released in 1986 (see 1986 in music).

The Collection was the first compilation of Grant's music to be released, and it was issued after her crossover success in 1985 with the album Unguarded. The Collection spanned Grant's first decade in music, and featured the new songs "Stay for Awhile" and "Love Can Do", the former of which was a Top Twenty Adult Contemporary hit in the United States.

Release 
The Collection was originally released in two different versions: a cassette version and an LP version. The LP version was directed to her newer fans, who knew her primarily for her Top 40 pop hit "Find a Way". The cassette version was directed to her older fans, who knew her for her Christian work as well as her secular work. The LP version contained ten tracks, and the cassette version contained fifteen tracks. In 1990, The Collection was re-released on CD with the 15 tracks featured on the cassette version, and two additional tracks, "Too Late" and "I'm Gonna Fly". Word Canada accidentally released the ten-track LP version to CD. The cover and tray art were that of the seventeen-track version causing confusion and recalls. They later issued the seventeen-track version as well. Of Grant's albums released prior to this compilation's release, Amy Grant (1977) and In Concert (1981) are the only albums that are not represented with songs included on this compilation. According to CCM Magazine, The Collection is the best-selling Christian music compilation album ever released, having sold in excess of 1 million copies.

An unauthorized reproduction of the album artwork (featuring Amy Grant) was used for issue No. 15 of the Marvel Comics series Dr. Strange. Apparently, the issue's artist was a fan of the singer and decided to use her likeness for a character in the story.

In 2007, The Collection was reissued and digitally remastered by Grant's new record label, EMI/Sparrow Records. The remastered edition is labeled with a "Digitally Remastered" logo in the 'gutter' on the CD front.

Track listing

LP version

Side A

Side B

Original cassette version

Side one

Side two

CD version

Personnel 
 Amy Grant – lead vocals, background vocals on "Stay for Awhile" 
 Dann Huff – guitars
 Nathan East – bass guitar
 Michael W. Smith – keyboards
 Robbie Buchanan – keyboards
 David Gamson – keyboards
 Shane Keister – keyboards on "Stay for Awhile" 
 Steve Schaffer – Synclavier programming on "Stay for Awhile" 
 Paul Leim – drums
 Paulinho Da Costa – percussion 
 Richard Page – background vocals on "Stay for Awhile"
 Gary Chapman – background vocals on "Love Can Do"
 Greg X. Volz – background vocals on "Love Can Do"
 Chris Harris – background vocals on "Love Can Do"
 Mark Heimermann – background vocals on "Love Can Do"

Production
 Producer – Brown Bannister
 Co-Producer on "Stay for Awhile" and "Love Can Do" – John Potoker
 Executive producers – Michael Blanton, Dan Harrell and Gary Chapman
 Engineers – Sabrina Buchanek, Ed Goodreau and John Potoker
 Additional Engineering – Spencer Chrislu, Steve McMillan and J.T.
 Mixed by Sabrina Buchanek and Ed Goodreau at Blue Jay Recording (Carlisle, Massachusetts) and Larabee Sound Studios (North Hollywood, California)
 Mastered by Doug Sax at The Mastering Lab (Hollywood, California)
 Art direction and design – Kent Hunter
 Photography – Mark Tucker

Charts

Weekly charts

End of year charts

End-of-decade charts

Certifications and sales

Accolades 
GMA Dove Awards

References 

Albums produced by Brown Bannister
Amy Grant compilation albums
1986 compilation albums
A&M Records compilation albums
Myrrh Records albums